Selar boops, the oxeye scad, is a species of ray-finned fish in the family Carangidae, the scads, jacks and trevallies. It is found in the Indo-Pacific. It is an important species for fisheries in some parts of its range.

Description
They have 9 dorsal spines, 23 to 25 dorsal soft rays, 3 anal spines, and 19 to 21 anal soft rays. This fish is silvery blue with a horizontal yellow line going through the middle. It has a large eye which takes up around a third of the head and its specific name, boops refers to this feature being a compound of bo meaning "ox" and ops meaning "eye".

Distribution
Its range in the Indian Ocean is from Sri Lanka and eastern India to the Andaman Sea, Southeast Asia, and north western Australia. Other populations occur in the Pacific Ocean around Southeast Asia, northern Australia, various Pacific islands, and Central America.

Habitat and biology
Selar boops is most commonly recorded over seagrass beds or softer substrates but it also occurs over coral and rocky reefs. It forms large diurnal schools, which disperse at night to feed  crabs, shrimps and small fishes which are caught either in the water column or from the bottom. Its eggs are pelagic.

Human use
Selar boops is a commercially important target species for fisheries in some parts its distribution. In Indonesia various types of fishing gear are used to catch this species including purse seines, gill nets, lift nets, handlines and beach seines.

References

boops
Fish described in 1833
Taxa named by Georges Cuvier